This is a list of cases reported in volume 198 of United States Reports, decided by the Supreme Court of the United States in 1905.

Justices of the Supreme Court at the time of volume 198 U.S. 

The Supreme Court is established by Article III, Section 1 of the Constitution of the United States, which says: "The judicial Power of the United States, shall be vested in one supreme Court . . .". The size of the Court is not specified; the Constitution leaves it to Congress to set the number of justices. Under the Judiciary Act of 1789 Congress originally fixed the number of justices at six (one chief justice and five associate justices). Since 1789 Congress has varied the size of the Court from six to seven, nine, ten, and back to nine justices (always including one chief justice).

When the cases in volume 198 were decided the Court comprised the following nine members:

Notable Cases in 198 U.S.

Lochner v. New York
Lochner v. New York,  198 U.S. 45 (1905), is a landmark decision in which the Supreme Court ruled that a New York state law setting maximum working hours for bakers violated the bakers' right to freedom of contract under the Fourteenth Amendment to the U.S. Constitution. The underlying case began in 1899 when Joseph Lochner, a German immigrant who owned a bakery in Utica, New York, was charged with violating New York's Bakeshop Act of 1895. The Bakeshop Act had made it a crime for New York bakeries to employ bakers for more than 10 hours per day or 60 hours per week. He was convicted and ultimately appealed to the U.S. Supreme Court. A majority of the Supreme Court held that the law violated the due process clause, stating that the law constituted an "unreasonable, unnecessary and arbitrary interference with the right and liberty of the individual to contract". Four dissenting justices rejected that view, and the dissent of Justice Oliver Wendell Holmes, Jr., in particular, became one of the most famous opinions in US legal history. Holmes wrote:

"[A] constitution is not intended to embody a particular economic theory, whether of paternalism and the organic relation of the citizen to the State or of laissez faire. It is made for people of fundamentally differing views, and the accident of our finding certain opinions natural and familiar or novel and even shocking ought not to conclude our judgment upon the question whether statutes embodying them conflict with the Constitution of the United States. General propositions do not decide concrete cases". (198 U.S. 75-76)

United States v. Ju Toy
In United States v. Ju Toy,  198 U.S. 253 (1905), the Supreme Court held that a citizen of the United States could be barred entry into the country based solely on an administrative decision, without routine recourse to the courts even on the factual question of citizenship. The Court determined that refusing entry at a port does not deny due process, and held that findings by immigration officials are conclusive and not subject to judicial review unless there is evidence of bias or negligence. This case marked a shift in the Court in respect to habeas corpus petitions and altered the judicial landscape for citizens applying for admission into the United States as well as for those facing deportation. The Court came to a different conclusion in 1922, that habeas corpus petitioners are entitled to a de novo judicial hearing to determine whether they are U.S. citizens (Ng Fung Ho v. White).

Citation style 

Under the Judiciary Act of 1789 the federal court structure at the time comprised District Courts, which had general trial jurisdiction; Circuit Courts, which had mixed trial and appellate (from the US District Courts) jurisdiction; and the United States Supreme Court, which had appellate jurisdiction over the federal District and Circuit courts—and for certain issues over state courts. The Supreme Court also had limited original jurisdiction (i.e., in which cases could be filed directly with the Supreme Court without first having been heard by a lower federal or state court). There were one or more federal District Courts and/or Circuit Courts in each state, territory, or other geographical region.

The Judiciary Act of 1891 created the United States Courts of Appeals and reassigned the jurisdiction of most routine appeals from the district and circuit courts to these appellate courts. The Act created nine new courts that were originally known as the "United States Circuit Courts of Appeals." The new courts had jurisdiction over most appeals of lower court decisions. The Supreme Court could review either legal issues that a court of appeals certified or decisions of court of appeals by writ of certiorari.

Bluebook citation style is used for case names, citations, and jurisdictions.  
 "# Cir." = United States Court of Appeals
 e.g., "3d Cir." = United States Court of Appeals for the Third Circuit
 e.g.,"C.C.D.N.J." = United States Circuit Court for the District of New Jersey
 e.g.,"D. Mass." = United States District Court for the District of Massachusetts 
 "E." = Eastern; "M." = Middle; "N." = Northern; "S." = Southern; "W." = Western
 e.g.,"C.C.S.D.N.Y." = United States Circuit Court for the Southern District of New York
 e.g.,"M.D. Ala." = United States District Court for the Middle District of Alabama
 "Ct. Cl." = United States Court of Claims
 The abbreviation of a state's name alone indicates the highest appellate court in that state's judiciary at the time. 
 e.g.,"Pa." = Supreme Court of Pennsylvania
 e.g.,"Me." = Supreme Judicial Court of Maine

List of cases in volume 198 U.S.

Notes and references

See also
Certificate of division

External links
  Case reports in volume 198 from Library of Congress
  Case reports in volume 198 from Court Listener
  Case reports in volume 198 from the Caselaw Access Project of Harvard Law School
  Case reports in volume 198 from Google Scholar
  Case reports in volume 198 from Justia
  Case reports in volume 198 from Open Jurist
 Website of the United States Supreme Court
 United States Courts website about the Supreme Court
 National Archives, Records of the Supreme Court of the United States
 American Bar Association, How Does the Supreme Court Work?
 The Supreme Court Historical Society